Second Helpings is a compilation album by the British synthpop band Blancmange. It contains most of the band's singles from the period 1982-85, as well as a previously unreleased track.

Track listing

CD: 828 043-2

CD: 828 218-2
The Canadian release added three remixes to the CD, and substituted a different version of "Game Above My Head," for a total length of 76:22.

 All songs written by Neil Arthur & Stephen Luscombe, except for "The Day Before You Came", written by Benny Andersson & Björn Ulvaeus.

References

1990 compilation albums
Blancmange (band) compilation albums
London Records compilation albums